The Commission scolaire de la Pointe-de-l'Île (CSPÎ) was a francophone school board in Montreal, Quebec, Canada, based primarily in the city's east end. It served Montréal-Nord, Saint-Léonard, Anjou, and Rivière-des-Prairies–Pointe-aux-Trembles. It also served Montréal-Est, a municipality outside of the Montreal city limits. Its headquarters is in the Pointe-aux-Trembles area of Montreal.

Commission scolaire de la Pointe-de-l'Île (Pointe-de-l'Île school commission or school board), was created by the government of Quebec on July 1, 1998, as part of a general restructuring from school boards representing religious communities to those representing linguistic communities. The CSPI replaced the former Commission scolaire Jérôme-Le Royer while also incorporating some francophone schools from other commissions. There were 27,500 students enrolled in schools associated with the board at the time of its founding; by 2011, the number had grown to 35,000. The eastern portion of the former Montreal Catholic School Commission became a part of the CSPÎ.

The commission was overseen by a group of elected school commissioners. Vincenzo Arciresi was the first chair of the commission and served in this capacity until his defeat by Miville Boudreault in the 2014 council election, the first in which the chair was directly elected.

It was replaced by the Centre de services scolaire de la Pointe-de-l'Île.

Schools

Secondary schools

 École secondaire d'Anjou (Anjou)
 École secondaire Antoine-de-St-Exupéry (St. Leonard)
 École secondaire Calixa-Lavallée (Montreal North)
 École secondaire Daniel-Johnson (Pointe-aux-Trembles)
 École secondaire Guy-Vanier
 École secondaire Henri-Bourassa (Montreal North)
 École secondaire Jean-Grou (Rivière-des-Prairies)
 École secondaire La Passerelle
 Le Prélude and Le Prélude annexe (Montreal North)
 École secondaire La Relance
 École secondaire Le Tournesol
 École secondaire Pointe-aux-Trembles (Pointe-aux-Trembles)

Primary schools

Adélard-Desrosiers (Montreal North)
Albatros
Alphonse-Pesant (St. Leonard)
Cardinal-Léger (Anjou)
Chénier (Anjou)
De la Fraternité (Montreal North)
Denise-Pelletier (Rivière-des-Prairies) 
Des Roseraies (Anjou)
Félix-Leclerc (Pointe-aux-Trembles)
Fernand-Gauthier (Rivière-des-Prairies)
François-La Bernarde (Pointe-aux-Trembles)
Gabrielle-Roy (St. Leonard)
Jacques-Rousseau (Anjou)
Jean-Nicolet and Jean-Nicolet Annexe (Montreal North)
Jules-Verne (Montreal North)
La Dauversière (St. Leonard)
Lambert-Closse
Le Carignan (Montreal North)
Le Tournesol (Pointe-aux-Trembles)
Marc-Aurèle-Fortin and Marc-Aurèle-Fortin annexe (Rivière-des-Prairies)
Montmartre (Pointe-aux-Trembles)
Notre-Dame (Pointe-aux-Trembles)
Notre-Dame-de-Fatima (Rivière-des-Prairies)
Pie XII (St. Leonard)
Pierre-de-Coubertin (Montreal North)
René-Guénette (Montreal North)
Belle-rive pavillon de la pointe 
Saint-Joseph (Anjou)
Saint-Marcel (Pointe-aux-Trembles)
Saint-Octave (Montreal East)
Saint-Rémi and Saint-Rémi Annexe (Montreal North)
Saint-Vincent-Marie (Montreal North)
Sainte-Colette and Sainte-Colette Annexe (Montreal North)
Sainte-Germaine-Cousin (Pointe-aux-Trembles)
Sainte-Gertrude (Montreal North)
Sainte-Marguerite-Bourgeoys (Pointe-aux-Trembles)
Belle-rive pavillon des trembles (Pointe-aux-Trembles)
Simone-Desjardins Pavillon Gouin (Rivière-des-Prairies)
Simone-Desjardins Pavillon Perras
Victor-Lavigne (St. Leonard)
Wilfrid-Bastien (St. Leonard)
Wilfrid-Pelletier (Anjou)

Other schools
Specialized schools:
Guy-Vanier
La Passerelle
Le Tournesol
Marc-Laflamme/Le Prélude

Adult schools:
Centre Amos
Centre Anjou
Centre Antoine-de-St-Exupéry
Centre Eusèbe-Gagnon
Centre Ferland
Centre Louis-Fréchette
Centre Louis-Fréchette Annexe
Centre Paul-Gratton

Professional development centres:
Centre Anjou
Centre Antoine-de-St-Exupéry
Centre Calixa-Lavallée
Centre Daniel-Johnson
Centre de formation des métiers de l'acier
École Hôtelière de Montréal Calixa-Lavallée

Elections for school trustees

1998

2003

2007

2014

References

External links

Commission scolaire de la Pointe-de-l'Île 

School districts in Quebec
Education in Montreal